Parliamentary elections were held in Portugal on 17 November 1895. They were boycotted by the Progressive Party and the Portuguese Republican Party, resulting in the Regeneration Party and a small number of independents winning all the seats.

Results

The results exclude the six seats won at national level and those from overseas territories.

References

Legislative elections in Portugal
1895 elections in Europe
1895 elections in Portugal
November 1895 events